John Russ  (April 1, 1858 – January 18, 1912) was a professional baseball player who played in one game for the 1882 Baltimore Orioles of the American Association. He played in the outfield and pitched in the game.

External links

1858 births
1912 deaths
Baltimore Orioles (AA) players
Major League Baseball outfielders
Major League Baseball pitchers
Baseball players from Indiana
19th-century baseball players
People from Cannelton, Indiana